Operation Septentrion was a 36-hour military operation of the International Security Assistance Force (ISAF), a NATO-led security mission, that took place December 16–18, 2009, in the Uzbin Valley of eastern Afghanistan.

A part of the War in Afghanistan, it involved a force of 1,100 troops, including 750 to 800 French troops, 200 United States Special Forces and Afghan National Army (ANA) soldiers.

Background
Sixteen months before the operation, the Uzbin Valley ambush, on August 18, 2008, by the Taliban in the area of Surobi, Afghanistan, had killed ten French soldiers and wounded twenty-one.

Goals
The operation's purpose was "reaffirming the sovereignty of Afghan security forces in the north of the Uzbeen Valley", according to a French military spokesperson, as well as to plant the Afghan flag in what was called a key strategic village. (While 75 percent of the Uzbin Valley had been under ISAF control, the rest of the valley had been under the control of the Taliban.)

Fighting
During more than 90 minutes of combat, several US soldiers were wounded, including three serious injuries. The Taliban fighters attacked with rocket-propelled grenades, mortars and heavy machine gun fire; for the coalition forces, the French troops used shells, backed up by French Tigre and US Apache helicopters and fighter jets. At least one Taliban fighter was killed and three were injured, according to Lieutenant-Colonel Hervé Wallerand, who led the operation.

Strategy
The French employed what was called the "Mikado strategy" (la stratégie du Mikado), after the game Mikado (known in North America as "pick-up sticks"), because of the need to plan every move carefully with constant awareness that one wrong step could risk everything being lost. In particular, the Mikado strategy emphasizes consulting with local inhabitants in a shura (or consultation) to minimize the risk of local civilians conspiring against the ANA and ISAF forces. For this reason the operation was preceded by "weeks of negotiations with local villagers", according to the BBC News.

Aftermath
In July 2011, the Croix de la Valeur Militaire ("cross of military valour"), a French military decoration, was presented to five Americans – Cpt. Thomas Harper, Master Sgt. David Nuemer, Sgt. 1st Class Ryan Ahern, Staff Sgt. Casey Roberts and Sgt. Ryan Meister – for their service during the operation.

See also

 2009 in Afghanistan
 Coalition combat operations in Afghanistan in 2009
 Groupement tactique interarmes de Surobi

References

External links
  Operation Septentrion video (requires Lightbox video). French Ministry of Defense.

2009 in Afghanistan
Military operations of the War in Afghanistan (2001–2021) involving France
Military operations of the War in Afghanistan (2001–2021) involving the United States
NATO operations in Afghanistan
Recipients of the Cross for Military Valour